Philippine Floorball Association formerly known as the Floorball Philippines is the governing body of floorball in the Philippines.

History
The sporting body was founded as Floorball Philippines by the Athletes in Action Philippines on April 4, 2011 with its registration at the Securities and Exchange Commission. On May 8, 2011, FP was admitted as the 53rd member of the International Floorball Federation.

FP became the Philippine Floorball Association (PFA) which was organized on April 10, 2015 by UP Floorball Club, UMak Floorball, UA&P Dragons, and the De La Salle Zobel. The PFA was registered with the SEC on April 10, 2015. The sports body organized the first season of the Philippine Floorball League in 2012.

List of presidents
Ryan Elizaga (2011–2014)
Renato Bravo(2014–?)
Ralph Ramos

Member clubs
As of August 2016
Regular
Amoranto QC Floorball Club
De La Salle Manila Floorball Club
De La Salle Zobel Floorball Club
JDSC Floorball Club
Proverbs Floorball Club
UA&P Floorball Club
UMak Floorball Club
UP Floorball Club
Provisional
Assumption Makati Floorball Club
Ateneo de Manila Floorball Club
De La Salle Araneta Floorball Club
San Carlos Cebu Floorball Club
United South Floorball Club

References

External links
 
 Floorball Philippines at the IFF

Floorball governing bodies
Floorball
2011 establishments in the Philippines
Sports organizations established in 2011